
Gmina Borzęcin is a rural gmina (administrative district) in Brzesko County, Lesser Poland Voivodeship, in southern Poland.

Villages
Gmina Borzęcin contains the villages and settlements of Bielcza, Borzęcin, Jagniówka, Łęki, Przyborów and Waryś.

Neighbouring gminas
Gmina Borzęcin is bordered by the gminas of Brzesko, Dębno, Radłów, Szczurowa, Wierzchosławice and Wojnicz.

References
 Polish official population figures 2006

Borzecin
Brzesko County